The United States women's national volleyball team participates in international volleyball competitions and friendly games, and is governed by USA Volleyball. The current head coach is three-time Olympic gold medalist and retired dominant beach volleyball professional Karch Kiraly.

Before 2014, the United States women's national volleyball team had achieved second place six times in major competitions (1967 World Women's Volleyball Championship, 1984 Los Angeles Olympic Games, 2002 World Women's Volleyball Championship, 2008 Beijing Olympic Games, 2011 World Cup, 2012 London Olympic Games) but had never reached the top. In 2014, the team had a breakthrough to capture its first-ever major title by defeating China in the World Women's Volleyball Championship final. The team captured its first-ever Olympic gold medal during the 2020 Tokyo Olympics.

Tournament record

Summer Olympics
 Champions   Runners up   Third place   Fourth place

World Championship
 Champions   Runners up   Third place   Fourth place

World Cup

 Champions   Runners up   Third place   Fourth place

World Grand Champions Cup

 Champions   Runners up   Third place   Fourth place

Nations League
 Champions   Runners up   Third place   Fourth place

World Grand Prix
 Champions   Runners up   Third place   Fourth place

NORCECA Championship
 Champions   Runners up   Third place   Fourth place

Pan American Games
 Champions   Runners up   Third place   Fourth place

Pan American Cup
 Champions   Runners-up   Third place   Fourth place

Final Four Cup

 Champions   Runners up   Third place   Fourth place

Montreux Volley Masters
 Champions   Runners up   Third place   Fourth place

Current squad
Head coach:  Karch Kiraly

Notable squads

Coaching staff

Gallery

See also
 United States men's national volleyball team
 United States national beach volleyball team

References

External links
Official website
FIVB profile

United States
Women
Volleyball in the United States
Volleyball
World champion national volleyball teams